Fibroblast growth factor 11 also known as FGF11  is a human gene.

The protein encoded by this gene is a member of the intracellular fibroblast growth factor family.

References